Hernshaw is an unincorporated community in Kanawha County, West Virginia, United States. Hernshaw has a post office with ZIP code 25107.

The community's name is an amalgamation of the names Herndon and Renshaw, two men in the local coal mining industry.

References

Unincorporated communities in Kanawha County, West Virginia
Unincorporated communities in West Virginia